Braian Ezequiel Pedraza (born 8 May 1999) is an Argentine professional footballer who plays as a midfielder for Juventud Unida.

Career
Pedraza's career began with Almirante Brown. He appeared for his debut on 28 November 2018 in a 4–2 victory over Deportivo Español, replacing Diego García after eighty-one minutes. Four further substitute appearances arrived for Pedraza in 2018–19, one in each of the following four months.

In February 2021, Pedraza joined Juventud Unida.

Career statistics
.

References

External links

1999 births
Living people
Place of birth missing (living people)
Argentine footballers
Association football midfielders
Primera B Metropolitana players
Club Almirante Brown footballers
Juventud Unida de San Miguel players